Sylvicola notialis is a species of wood gnats, insects in the family Anisopodidae.

References

Anisopodidae
Articles created by Qbugbot
Insects described in 1965